The 2027 Schleswig-Holstein state election will be held in 2027 to elect the 21st Landtag of Schleswig-Holstein.

References

See also 

2027 elections in Germany
21st century in Schleswig-Holstein
Elections in Schleswig-Holstein